Elery is an unincorporated community in Henry County, in the U.S. state of Ohio.

History
A post office was established at Elery in 1881, and remained in operation until 1907. Besides the post office, Elery had a station on the New York, Chicago and St. Louis Railroad.

References

Unincorporated communities in Henry County, Ohio
Unincorporated communities in Ohio